Akçakoca District is a district of the Düzce Province of Turkey. Its seat is the town of Akçakoca. Its area is 380 km2, and its population is 40,025 (2022).

Composition
There is one municipality in Akçakoca District:
 Akçakoca

There are 43 villages in Akçakoca District:

 Akkaya
 Aktaş
 Altunçay
 Arabacı
 Balatlı
 Beyhanlı
 Beyören
 Çayağzı
 Çiçekpınar
 Dadalı
 Davutağa
 Deredibi
 Dereköy
 Dilaver
 Doğancılar
 Döngelli
 Edilli
 Esmahanım
 Fakıllı
 Göktepe
 Hasançavuş
 Hemşin
 Kalkın
 Karatavuk
 Kepenç
 Kınık
 Kirazlı
 Koçar
 Koçullu
 Küpler
 Kurugöl
 Kurukavak
 Melenağzı
 Nazımbey
 Ortanca
 Paşalar
 Sarıyayla
 Subaşı
 Tahirli
 Tepeköy
 Uğurlu
 Yenice
 Yeşilköy

Population

References

Districts of Düzce Province